Manuel Sofovich (Pergamino, 1900 – Buenos Aires, June 3, 1960) was an Argentine journalist. Sofovich was the son of Russian Jewish immigrants.

He was the father of screenwriters Hugo and Gerardo Sofovich.

References 

1900 births
1960 deaths
People from Pergamino
Argentine journalists
Male journalists
Argentine Jews
Argentine people of Russian-Jewish descent
20th-century journalists